Tyler Kolek (born March 27, 2001) is an American college basketball player for Marquette Golden Eagles of the Big East Conference. He previously played for the George Mason Patriots.

Early life and high school
Kolek grew up in Cumberland, Rhode Island and initially attended Cumberland High School. He transferred to St. George's School prior to the start of his junior year. Kolek was named the Rhode Island Gatorade Boys Basketball Player of the Year as a junior after averaging 18.6 points, 8.4 rebounds, 2.8 assists, and 2.5 steals per game. He committed to play college basketball at George Mason over offers from Elon, Northeastern, Holy Cross, and Vermont.

College career
Kolek began his college career at George Mason. He was named the Atlantic 10 Conference Rookie of the Year as a freshman after averaging 10.8 points, 3.6 rebounds, and 2.3 assists per game. Following the end of the season, Kolek entered the NCAA transfer portal.

Kolek ultimately transferred to Marquette. He averaged 6.7 points per game and led the Big East Conference with 5.9 assists per game in his first season with the Golden Eagles. Kolek was named the Big East Player of the Year and first team All-Big East as a junior. He was also named the Most Outstanding Player of the 2023 Big East tournament after averaging 18.7 points, seven rebounds, and five assists in the three games.

Personal life
Kolek's father, Kevin Kolek, a retired police officer, played college basketball at Southeastern Massachusetts University (now the University of Massachusetts Dartmouth) and was named the Little East Conference Player of The Year twice. His older brother, Brandon, plays basketball at Franklin Pierce University.

References

External links
George Mason Patriots bio
Marquette Golden Eagles bio

2001 births
Living people
All-American college men's basketball players
American men's basketball players
Basketball players from Rhode Island
George Mason Patriots men's basketball players
Marquette Golden Eagles men's basketball players
Point guards